Grier City is a census-designated place located in Rush Township, Schuylkill County in the state of Pennsylvania, United States.  Grier City was part of the Grier City-Park Crest CDP for the 2000 census, before splitting into two separate CDPs for the 2010 census, the other being Park Crest.  The community is located off Interstate 81.  As of the 2010 census, the population was 241 residents.  As of the 2020 census, the population was 296 residents.

Demographics

References

Census-designated places in Schuylkill County, Pennsylvania
Census-designated places in Pennsylvania